Juan Carlos Calvo (June 26, 1906 in Montevideo – October 12, 1977) was an Uruguayan footballer. He was part of the team that won the first ever World Cup in 1930 for Uruguay, but he did not play any matches in the tournament. He was a club player of Miramar Misiones.

Honours
Miramar Misiones
 Divisional Intermedia (2nd level): 1935 (as Misiones)
 Divisional Extra (3rd level): 1937 (as Miramar)

Uruguay
 FIFA World Cup: 1930

References
World Cup Champions Squads 1930 - 2002
O nascimento da mítica Celeste Olímpica 

1906 births
Footballers from Montevideo
Uruguayan footballers
Uruguay international footballers
1930 FIFA World Cup players
FIFA World Cup-winning players
Miramar Misiones players
1977 deaths

Association football forwards